Luigi Conconi (Milan, 1852–1917) was an Italian painter, who is considered part of the Scapigliatura movement.

Biography
Luigi Conconi graduated from the Milan Polytechnic in 1874 and started work as an architect, a career that he combined from the very outset with painting. Associated with the artist Tranquillo Cremona and the Scapigliatura movement, he founded the satirical newspaper Guerin Meschino in 1882 together with Guido Pisani Dossi, Luca Beltrami and other friends. The illustrations he produced for this publication display a talent for engraving developed over the previous decade that was to win critical acclaim at the international level. He shared a studio with Gaetano Previati until 1885 and took part in the major Milanese and Venetian exhibitions during this period and the following decade. It was in the early years of the new century that he also began showing portraits and landscapes at the major international events.

References
 Luigi Conconi, online catalogue Artgate by Fondazione Cariplo, 2010, CC BY-SA (source for the first revision of this article).

Other projects

19th-century Italian painters
Italian male painters
20th-century Italian painters
20th-century Italian male artists
1852 births
1917 deaths
Scapigliatura Movement
Painters from Milan
19th-century Italian male artists